A teen center is a community center serving adolescents in a community. It may provide services for at-risk teens, help to meet their health needs, serve to discourage anti-social behavior, and help teens to find employment. 

The purposes of a teen center are:

 explore their interests and talents in a self-directed manner;
 access support and mentorship in such vital things as leadership skills, communication skills, well-being, careers advice;
 and, crucially, get support in writing university, scholarship and job applications to secure future success and fulfilment.

An example of a teen center implementing in Laos is the Wellspring Teen Centre Vientiane.

References

Community centres
Adolescence
Adolescent medicine